James Lucion Snyder (born July 21, 1951) is an American writer. He is a minister with the Christian and Missionary Alliance and an author and humorist whose writings have appeared in more than eighty periodicals including Guideposts. Snyder's first book, his 1991 biography of A.W. Tozer, In Pursuit of God: The Life of A. W. Tozer, won the Reader's Choice Award in 1992 by Christianity Today. Snyder has authored 25 books.

Through fifty years of ministry, he and his wife Martha, affectionately known as "The Gracious Mistress of the Parsonage," have been involved in three church-planting projects prior to their current ministry at the Family of God Fellowship in Ocala, Florida. , whatafellowship.com. Retrieved May 1, 2009.</ref> The Snyders have three children and seven grandchildren.

References

External links
 

1951 births
Living people
Members of the Christian and Missionary Alliance
Place of birth missing (living people)
People from Ocala, Florida
American religious writers
American male non-fiction writers
20th-century American non-fiction writers
20th-century American male writers
21st-century American non-fiction writers
21st-century American male writers
Writers from Florida